Chapelle Creek is a stream in the U.S. state of South Dakota.

Chapelle Creek has the name of David Chapelle, a pioneer trader.

See also
List of rivers of South Dakota

References

Rivers of Hughes County, South Dakota
Rivers of Hyde County, South Dakota
Rivers of South Dakota